Simon Peter Randolph (January 10, 1835 – January 15, 1909) was a pioneer steamboat captain in the Kent Valley near Seattle, Washington. He was born in Logan County, Illinois to Brooks Randolph and Susan Dotson. His daughter's name was Edith. He went into business with his son-in-law.

His obituary states that he came to Seattle in 1868 and "...was engaged in transporting coal for the Lake Washington Coal Company..."

"In 1871, a new entry joined the growing competition for the White River transportation trade. Captain Simon Peter Randolph had been active in boating on the Duwamish and Black Rivers and Lake Washington since 1868, and was responsible for dredging much of the lower White River, clearing it of many logs and snags."

At first the round trip took four days, gradually he dredged the river clearing it of snags.  He also cleared the Black River between its outlet and the Duwamish River.

Notes

References 
White River Journal 
History of Kent
Family Tree
The Record Volumes 34–39, Friends of the Washington State University

1835 births
1909 deaths
People from King County, Washington
Sea captains
19th-century American businesspeople